Chyliza leptogaster is a species of rust flies (insects in the family Psilidae).

Range
Andorra, Belgium, Britain, Czech Republic, Denmark, Germany, Hungary, Ireland, Italy, Norway, Sicily, Slovakia, Spain & Switzerland.

References

Psilidae
Insects described in 1798
Muscomorph flies of Europe